NGC 4090 is a spiral galaxy located 340 million light-years away in the constellation Coma Berenices. The galaxy was discovered by astronomer Heinrich d'Arrest on May 2, 1864 and is a member of the NGC 4065 Group.

NGC 4090 hosts an AGN.

On April 5, 2018 a type Ia supernova designated as SN 2018aqh was discovered in NGC 4090.

See also
 List of NGC objects (4001–5000)

References

External links
 

4090
038288
Coma Berenices
Astronomical objects discovered in 1864
Spiral galaxies
NGC 4065 Group
Active galaxies
07077
Discoveries by Heinrich Louis d'Arrest